Posyolok Lnozavoda is a rural locality (a settlement) in Rostilovskoye Rural Settlement, Gryazovetsky District, Vologda Oblast, Russia. The population was 370 as of 2002. There are 3 streets.

Geography 
The settlement is located 5 km south of Gryazovets (the district's administrative centre) by road. Kornilyevo is the nearest rural locality.

References 

Rural localities in Gryazovetsky District